Shu Ting (born 1952 in Jinjiang, Fujian) is the pen name of Gong Peiyu, a modern Chinese poet associated with the Misty Poets. She began writing poetry in the 1970's and later had her works published.

Life
Shu Ting grew up in Jinjiang, Fujian. However, as a teenager her father was accused of ideological aberrance and moved her to the countryside. Upon her return to Fujian, she took up job positions at a cement factory, a textile mill, and a lightbulb factory.

She began to write poetry and, in 1979, published her first poem and was one of the first people to have her work published in the underground journal Jīntiān (Today). She became part of the group known as the Misty Poets. Other Misty Poets include Bei Dao, Gu Cheng, Fei Ye, and Duo Duo. The journal, Jīntiān ran from 1978 to 1980 until Deng Xiaoping, a new Chinese statesman halted the publication due to suspicions of ideological nonconformity.

In the early 1980s, she achieved prominence as the leading female representative of the Misty Poets. She was the only Misty Poet given official government support. Because of this she worked clandestinely with other poets such as Gu Cheng and Bei Dao. Her first collection, Shuangwei Chuan appeared in 1982, as did a joint-collection with Gu Cheng.

She married her husband Zhongyi Chen in 1982.

She was asked to join the official Chinese Writers' Association, and won the National Outstanding Poetry Award in 1981 and 1983.

During the "anti-spiritual pollution" movement that was launched in 1983, she, like other writers that were thought to be subversive by the state, was heavily criticized. Following this, she published two collections with poetry: Hui changge de yiweihua and Shizuniao.

Works 

 The mist of my heart: selected poems of Shu Ting, Translator William O'Donnell, Panda Books, 1995, 
 Book: Shu Ting: Selected Poems (ed. by Eva Hung). Hong Kong: Renditions Paperbacks, 1994.
Shu,Ting. Shuang Wei Chuan. Shanghai: Shanghai wen yi chu ban she, 1982. Print.

Writing style 
Shu Ting's writing style is known to be very straightforward. Andrea Lingenfelter's describes Shu Ting in her review of Selected Poems. An Authorized Collection by Eva Hung: "her attitude [as] idealistic, patriotic, and yet apolitical. In terms of form, the poet takes few, if any, risks." Her work is also known to have somewhat of a feminine voice, characterized by a personal style. At the time it stood out because of the contrast of styles between what was being advanced by the government.

Many of her works were published during the Cultural Revolution and were scrutinized by the government, even if they did not have direct political references.

Anthology inclusions

See also 
Misty Poets

Bei Dao

Duo Duo

Fei Ye

Gu Cheng

Yang Lian

Further reading  
An Apostrophe Cast episode with translations of Shu Ting's poems by Michael Swierz and Ying Xu.
"Shu Ting", Renditions, a Chinese-English translation magazine, last accessed June 5, 2007
"From the Archive: Carolyn Kizer and Shu Ting", poets.org
 舒婷检点自己的爱情*

External links

An Apostrophe Cast episode with translations of Shu Ting's poems by Michael Swierz and Ying Xu.
"Shu Ting", Renditions, a Chinese-English translation magazine, last accessed June 5, 2007
"From the Archive: Carolyn Kizer and Shu Ting", poets.org
 舒婷检点自己的爱情

References

Bibliography

 Kubin, Wolfgang. “Writing with Your Body: Literature as a Wound— Remarks on the Poetry of Shu Ting.” Modern Chinese Literature, vol. 4, no. 1/2, 1988, pp. 149–162. JSTOR, www.jstor.org/stable/41490632.
Lingenfelter, Andrea. Modern Chinese Literature, vol. 9, no. 2, 1996, pp. 395–397. JSTOR, www.jstor.org/stable/41490766.
 Yeh, Michelle. “Misty Poetry.” The Columbia Companion to Modern Chinese Literature, Columbia University Press, 2016, pp. 286–292.
Zhang, Yingjin. A Companion to Modern Chinese Literature. John Wiley & Sons, 2016.

1952 births
Hokkien people
Chinese women poets
Living people
People from Quanzhou
Poets from Fujian
Misty poets
20th-century Chinese women writers
20th-century Chinese writers
21st-century Chinese women writers
21st-century Chinese writers